In shogi, Flatfish (olive flounder, 平目 hirame) is a Central Rook (Ranging Rook) opening.

It characteristically uses the Flatfish castle (平目囲い or ヒラメ囲い hiramegakoi) instead of the more usual Mino castle.

See also

 Central Rook
 Central Rook Silver Horns
 Cheerful Central Rook
 Ranging Rook

Bibliography

Shogi openings
Ranging Rook openings
Central Rook openings